GreedFall is an action role-playing game developed by Spiders and published by Focus Home Interactive. The game is set in an early 18th century-styled fantasy setting and was released for Microsoft Windows, PlayStation 4, and Xbox One on September 10, 2019, and subsequently in a graphically uplifted and performance enhanced version for PlayStation 5 and Xbox Series X/S on June 30, 2021. 

GreedFall was met with a mixed critical reception. A prequel is currently in development.

Gameplay
The player, alongside other settlers, mercenaries, and treasure hunters, explores a remote island where the locals, who are fighting off invading settlers, are protected by supernatural beings. The game includes combat, diplomacy, and stealth. The player's decisions influence and affect the game's story, as well as the relationship between the different factions established on the island. The game also supports enhanced graphical capabilities on the PlayStation 4 Pro and Xbox One X.

Synopsis

Setting
An island paradise has been discovered by colonial forces from several distinct nations from fictional lands, but with magic and monsters. Players assume the role of De Sardet, a neutral Human who recently arrived at the island, able to ally with either the natives who inhabit the land, or any of the foreign nations competing to conquer and colonize the "new" land, while also trying to find a cure to a mysterious illness that plagues De Sardet and their homeland.

Plot 
De Sardet, a noble of the Merchant Congregation, prepares to travel to the newly-settled island of Teer Fradee to serve as Legate to Prince Constantin d'Orsay, De Sardet's cousin and the newly-appointed governor of New Serene, the Congregation's capital on the island. The Congregation hopes that the exotic environment of Teer Fradee will yield a cure for the malichor, a deadly plague spreading on the continent.

The group arrives on Teer Fradee and De Sardet is quickly dispatched to establish diplomatic relations with the island natives and two neighboring countries with a presence on the island. De Sardet gains several new allies and learns of the doneigada, native islanders with a supernatural bond to the earth that grants them mystical abilities. De Sardet's investigations into the malichor reveal that the natives worship a being known as "en on mil frichtimen" which has a connection to the island. De Sardet believes en on mil frichtimen to be real, and capable of curing the malichor with its power, and begins seeking a way to speak with it.

Constantin's health begins to decline and he soon learns he is infected with the malichor. After thwarting an attempted coup by the Congregation's mercenary guards, De Sardet contacts a native healer named Catasach to relieve Constantin's pain while the search for a cure continues. De Sardet learns that en on mil frichtimen'''s sanctuary can only be opened by the high king of the natives, Vinbarr, who has been missing for months. Upon returning to New Serene, De Sardet learns that Catasach and Constantin are missing. De Sardet finds Catasach dead and learns that Constantin has been taken by Vinbarr into the mountains. De Sardet tracks Vinbarr to his lair and kills him before bringing Constantin back to New Serene.

Three days later, Constantin's sickness is cured, but his physical appearance has changed, becoming similar to that of the natives. He reveals that Catasach took him to perform a ritual to turn him into a doneigad, making him resistant to the malichor. With Vinbarr dead, De Sardet intervenes in the native's election of the new high king and gets the winning candidate to promise entry into en on mil frichtimen's sanctuary. De Sardet is allowed to enter and speaks to the being, who reveals that the malichor is not a disease, but a poison generated by the continent in response to its exploitation by its people. It promises to help cure the malichor, but warns that Constantin's actions are weakening it.

Confused and horrified by the warning, De Sardet discovers that Constantin has become addicted to the power of the doneigad, and is performing more rituals to steal more of the island's power from en on mil frichtimen, intending to destroy both the natives and the settlers and rule the island alone. De Sardet confronts Constantin alone in the sanctuary, and is given the choice to either kill him and leave the island's fate in the hands of the factions, or join him in conquering the island.

If the player chooses to kill Constantin, the ending that follows will vary depending on the elected High King and the player's relationship with their companions and the various factions on Teer Fradee.

If the player chooses to join Constantin, the two cousins steal en on mil frichtimen power and become godlike beings, unleashing a reign of terror upon the world.

ReceptionGreedFall received "mixed or average reviews" on review aggregator Metacritic for the PC and PlayStation 4 versions based on 38 and 37 reviews respectively, while the Xbox One version received "generally favorable reviews" based on 14 reviews.

The game was nominated for "Best RPG" at the 2019 Titanium Awards, for "Game, Original Role Playing" at the NAVGTR Awards, and for "Best Message-Bearer Game", "Best Artistic Design", and "Best Game Setting" at the Pégases Awards 2020.

Sales

The PlayStation 4 version of GreedFall sold 13,292 physical copies within its first week on sale in Japan, making it the seventh bestselling retail game of the week in the country. It was confirmed in November 2020 that Greedfall had sold over one million copies worldwide. By May 2022, the game had shipped two million copies.

Prequel
A prequel titled GreedFall 2: The Dying World'' was announced on May 18, 2022.

References

External links
 

2019 video games
Action role-playing video games
Fantasy video games
Focus Entertainment games
PlayStation 4 games
PlayStation 4 Pro enhanced games
PlayStation 5 games
Single-player video games
Video games developed in France
Video games featuring protagonists of selectable gender
Video games scored by Olivier Deriviere
Video games set on fictional islands
Windows games
Xbox Cloud Gaming games
Xbox One games
Xbox One X enhanced games
Xbox Series X and Series S games
Spiders (company) games